Frederik s'Jacob (25 February 1822 – 3 April 1901) was Governor-General of the Dutch East Indies from 12 April 1881 to 20 January 1884.

References

External links
 

Governors-General of the Dutch East Indies
People from The Hague
Dutch people of French descent
1822 births
1901 deaths